Tipping the Scales is the sixth full-length album by Christian hardcore punk band No Innocent Victim. It was released in 2001 on Victory Records and Solid State Records.

Track listing 
"Degeneration" - 2:05
"Tipping the Scales" - 1:51
"Illusion" - 2:31
"Forward" - 1:51
"Cast Down" - 2:15
"Dead Weight" - 1:27
"Mr. Philosophy" - 2:28
"Calm Before the Storm" - 2:27
"Raping the Mind" - 2:01
"Will to Live" - 1:38
"Reunion" - 1:41

References

2001 albums
No Innocent Victim albums
Solid State Records albums